The Highwood River is a tributary of the Bow River in southwestern Alberta, Canada.

Course 

The Highwood originates in the Canadian Rockies in Peter Lougheed Provincial Park, in the Highwood Pass below Mount Arethusa. It flows south and is paralleled by the Kananaskis Trail between Elbow-Sheep Wildland Provincial Park, Don Getty Wildland Provincial Park, and Emerson Creek Park. It turns east and flows along Highway 541 and through the community of Longview.  Continuing east, it passes through High River, ending when it enters the Bow River southeast of Calgary.

Recreation 
The river is known for flyfishing. A variety of trout species live in the river, including native bull trout. In springtime when the snow is melting the river offers white water rafting.

Flooding 
The Highwood River is subject to frequent flooding. Flood events of exceptional magnitude occurred in 1894, 1899, 1902, 1908, 1912, 1923, 1929, 1932, 1942, 1995, 2005 and 2013. Most recently during the 2013 Alberta floods, thousands of people in Alberta were ordered to evacuate their homes after the rise of the Highwood River, Bow River, Elbow River and numerous others. Three people died as a result of the flooding of the Highwood River.

Tributaries and features 
From origin to mouth, the Highwood River receives the following tributaries or passes through these geographic features:

See also 
List of rivers of Alberta

References 

Rivers of Alberta
Bow River